Antonio Adamo (born 30 July 1957, Naples, Italy) is an Italian pornographic film director. He won the 2003 AVN Award for "Best Director, Foreign Release" for the film Gladiator I.

References

External links
 

1957 births
Living people
Italian pornographic film directors